Thurloo Downs Station most commonly known as Thurloo Downs is a pastoral lease that has operated as both a sheep station and a cattle station in outback New South Wales.

The property is about two thirds lightly timbered open country with the remainder made up of sandhills and stony ridges.

History
Established prior to 1883 in that year it was owned by Messrs Rowan and Mactier.

John Augustus Ibbott acquired the property in 1903 and settled there with his family of five sons and two daughters.

Sidney Kidman acquired the property in 1918 along with Urisino and Elsinora from Goldsbrough, Mort and Co.

In 1954 part of Thurloo Downs, along with Elsinora  Station were resumed for the soldier settlement scheme for returned servicemen from Korea and Malayan operation forces.

Thurloo Downs will be the site of a Total Solar Eclipse on 25 November, 2030.

See also
List of ranches and stations

References

Stations (Australian agriculture)
Pastoral leases in New South Wales
Far West (New South Wales)